Zameer Ullah Khan is an Indian politician and a member of  the 15th and 16th Legislative Assembly of India. He represents the Koil constituency of Uttar Pradesh and is a member of the Samajwadi Party.

Early life and education
Zameer Ullah Khan was born in Aligarh district. He is educated till eighth grade.

Political career
Zameer Ullah Khan  has been a MLA for two terms. He represented the Koil constituency and is a member of the Samajwadi Party political party.

Posts held

See also
 Aligarh (Assembly constituency)
 Koil (Assembly constituency)
 Sixteenth Legislative Assembly of Uttar Pradesh
 Uttar Pradesh Legislative Assembly

References

1966 births
Living people
People from Aligarh district
Samajwadi Party politicians
Uttar Pradesh MLAs 2007–2012
Uttar Pradesh MLAs 2012–2017